The 1932–33 Prima Divisione was the third level league of the 33rd Italian football championship.

In 1928, FIGC had decided a reform of the league structure of Italian football. The top-level league was the National Division, composed by the two divisions of Serie A and Serie B. Under them, there were the local championship, the major one being the First Division, that in 1935 will take the name of Serie C. Starting this season, the winners of the nine groups of First Division would be admitted to the final rounds, where three tickets of promotion to Serie B were available, whereas the scheduled relegations were annulled by the Federation which expanded the division, as the scheduled promotions were increased for an enlargement of next Serie B season. From this season, reserve teams of club belonging to Serie A were admitted in First Division.

Girone A

Final classification

Results

Girone B

Final classification

Results

Girone C

Final classification

Results

Girone D

Final classification

Results
TB: Vado-Casale B 2-1 ; Vado-Casteggio 2-1 ; Casale B-Casteggio 2-0.

Girone E

Final classification

Results

Girone F

Final classification

Results
TB: Viareggio-Lucchese 2-1.

Girone G

Final classification

Results

Girone H

Final classification

Results

Girone I

Final classification

Results

Final rounds
Following a fascist decision to improve their popularity, these finals were annulled and all the clubs were promoted to expand the Serie B.

Girone A

Girone B

Girone C

Serie C seasons
3
Italy